Johann-Peter-Hebel-Plakette is a literary prize, awarded annually since 1960, by the community of Hausen im Wiesental in Baden-Württemberg, Germany. The prize is given in memory of Johann Peter Hebel, on the Saturday before 10 May each year.

Winners

 1960 Ernst Niefenthaler
 1961 Karl Seith
 1962 Ernst Grether
 1963 Adolf Glattacker
 1964 Dr. Otto Kleiber
 1965 Hedwig Salm
 1966 Karl Ringwald
 1967 Paula Hollenweger
 1968 Dr. Eduard Sieber
 1969 Anton Dichtel
 1970 Hubert Baum
 1971 Maurus Gerner-Beuerle
 1972 Fritz Schülin
 1973 Gerhard Jung
 1974 Gustav Oberholzer
 1975 Julius Kilbiger
 1976 Otto Reinacher
 1977 Karl Kurrus
 1978 Alban Spitz
 1979 Married couple Albrecht-Vischer
 1980 Dr. Fritz Fischer
 1981 Werner Mennicke
 1983 Hans Krattiger-Enzler
 1984 Anne Franck-Neumann
 1985 Ernst Hug
 1986 Marcel Wunderlin
 1987 Werner Richter
 1988 Johannes Wenk-Madoery
 1989 Jean Dentinger
 1990 Ludwig Vögely
 1991 Dr. Beat Trachsler
 1992 Dr. Erhard Richter
 1993 Paul Nunnenmacher
 1994 Prof. Dr. Gustav Oberholzer
 1995 Dr. Rudolf Suter-Christ
 1996 Günter Braun
 1997 Emma Guntz
 1998 Karl Fritz
 1999 Thomas Burth
 2000 Gerhard Leser
 2001 Luise Katharina Meier ("Breiti-Lieseli")
 2002 Dr. Hans Viardot
 2003 Ernst Burren
 2004 Walter Arzet
 2005 Liesa Trefer-Blum
 2006 Paula Röttele
 2007 Lieselotte Reber-Liebrich
 2008 Werner Störk
 2009 Dr. Martin Keller
 2010 Karl Heinz Vogt
 2011 Liliane Bertolini
 2012 Ursula Hülse
 2013 Manfred MarkusJung
 2014 Klaus Schubring
 2015 Jürgen Kammerer
 2016 Uli Führe
 2017 Beatrice Mall-Grob
 2018 Hansjörg Noe
 2019 Edgar Zeidler
 2020 Thomas Schmidt
 2021 Dominik  Wunderlin

References

Literary awards of Baden-Württemberg